Loyola Medicine, also known as Loyola University Health System, is a quaternary-care system with a  main medical center campus in the western suburbs of Chicago, in the U.S. state of Illinois. The heart of the medical center campus is the Loyola University Medical Center. Also on campus are the Joseph Cardinal Bernardin Cancer Center (now named for the late Cardinal Joseph Louis Bernardin, Archbishop of Chicago,  who was a patient at the Cancer Center when he died in November 1996 from metastatic pancreatic cancer) Loyola Outpatient Center, Center for Heart & Vascular Medicine and Loyola Oral Health Center as well as the Loyola University Chicago Stritch School of Medicine (named for Samuel Cardinal Stritch, a former archbishop of Chicago), Loyola University Chicago Marcella Niehoff School of Nursing, Center for Translational Research and Education, and the Loyola Center for Fitness.

Loyola's Gottlieb campus in Melrose Park, Illinois includes the 264-licensed-bed community hospital, the Gottlieb Health and Fitness Center and the Marjorie G. Weinberg Cancer Care Center. In 2018, Tenet Healthcare sold the formerly for-profit MacNeal Hospital, in Berwyn, Illinois, to Loyola Medicine. Loyola University Health System has been a member of Trinity Health since July 2011. The Neiswanger Institute for Bioethics and Health Policy is a part of the Stritch School of Medicine.

Programs
Loyola University Medical Center has 50 residency and fellowship training programs in the following medical and surgical specialties.  Residency programs available are: anesthesia, combined medicine/pediatrics, dental medicine, dermatology, emergency medicine (starting in 2019), family medicine, general surgery, internal medicine, neurological surgery, neurology, nuclear medicine, obstetrics and gynecology, ophthalmology, oral/maxillofacial surgery, orthopaedic surgery, otolaryngology, pathology, pediatrics, physical medicine and rehabilitation, plastic and reconstructive surgery, podiatry, psychiatry and behavioral sciences, radiation oncology, radiology, thoracic and cardiovascular surgery, and urology.  Fellowship opportunities include: addiction medicine, advanced heart failure and transplant cardiology, anesthesia (CV and thoracic), anesthesia (pain management), body imaging, cardiology (EP), cardiology (interventional), cardiology (imaging), cytopathology, endocrinology and metabolism, endourology and laproscopic surgery, female pelvic medicine and reconstructive surgery, gastroenterology and nutrition, geriatric psychiatry, geriatric medicine, hand surgery, hematology and oncology, hematopathology, infectious disease, interventional radiology, neonatology, nephrology, neurology (clinical neurophysiology), neurology (headache medicine), neurology (vascular), neuroradiology, orthopaedic hand surgery, pulmonary and critical care medicine, rheumatology, surgical critical care, surgical pathology, and vascular surgery and endovascular therapy.

References

External links

Gottlieb Memorial Hospital (Melrose Park)
Gottlieb Center for Fitness
Loyola Graduate Medical Education

Loyola University Chicago
Healthcare in Illinois
Maywood, Illinois
Trauma centers
Hospitals established in 1969